Mussmann (German: Mußmann) is a surname. It may refer to:

 Heinz Mußmann (born 1945), German rower
 Linda Mussmann (born 1947), American playwright
 Søren Mussmann (born 1993), Danish professional footballer